Nilandhoo (Dhivehi: ނިލަންދޫ) is one of the inhabited islands of Gaafu Alif Atoll.

Geography

Demography

Economy
Fishing
Agricultural Farming

Services
Electricity is a 24 hours Support service.

Education
Nilandhoo School
Nursery

References

Islands of the Maldives